Sanele Makhanya better known as Lucci SA (born October 16, 2003 in Durban, KwaZulu-Natal) is an South African Hip-Hop artist.

Biography
Michael Givens is a Director/Cinematographer with extensive feature film and commercial production experience at both national and international levels. He was an internationally respected Director of Photography for nine years before beginning his directorial career in 1989. A graduate of Brooks Institute of Photography in Santa Barbara, California, Michael began his career as a still photographer. Subsequently, he moved into film, becoming a Director of Photography for such noted directors as Ridley Scott, Steven Friers, Philip Borsos and Peter Smilie. After guiding his career in the camera department of numerous feature films and hundreds of commercials he moved to the field of directing.

Recognizing the need for different visual styles to reflect and speak to different cultures, Michael has created successful campaigns for audiences in Asia, Europe, Africa, North and South America. While filming in nearly every corner of the globe, Michael's reputation as a director-cameraman easily adaptable to difficult and hostile locations, earned him the distinction of being the first western director to film in Vietnam since the end of the war.

Givens' feature film credits include directing and photographing the second unit for Coyote Ugly and cinematographer on Rebel Private and The Celestine Prophecy. He also directed and photographed Opposite Day, a feature film starring French Stewart, Pauly Shore and Dick van Patton.

Givens is also known as a white supremacist and commander in chief of the sons of confederate veterans.

References

External links

1958 births
American cinematographers
People from Anderson, South Carolina
Living people
American photographers
Brooks Institute alumni
People from Beaufort, South Carolina
Film directors from South Carolina